The 2008 Sukma Games, officially known as the 12th Sukma Games was a Malaysian multi-sport event held in Terengganu from 31 May to 9 June 2008. Selangorian swimmer Foo Jian Beng and Sarawakian swimmer Marellyn Liew were announced as Best Sportsman and Best Sportswoman of the event respectively.

Development and preparation
The 12th Sukma Games Organising Committee was formed to oversee the staging of the event.

Venues
The 2008 Sukma Games used a mix of new and existing venues. Some venues were existing public-sporting facilities, while others were newly constructed venues. Some retrofitting work were done in venues which are more than a decade old. They were revert to public use after the games.

At the centrepiece of the activities was the newly built Gong Badak Sports Complex. Incorporating the 50,000-seat Sultan Mizan Zainal Abidin Stadium, it hosts most of the events. A games village was not built, instead athletes and officials were housed in universities across Terengganu. Besides being physically near to the competition venues, it was hoped that it will add vibe to the host cities and reduce post-games costs in converting a dedicated games village to other uses.

The 12th Sukma Games had 32 venues for the games, 18 in Kuala Terengganu, 3 each in Hulu Terengganu and Kemaman respectively and 2 each in Besut, Dungun, Marang and Setiu respectively.

Demonstration sports
 Sultan Mahmud Science High School – Kabaddi
 Kuala Ibai – Formula Future

Marketing

Logo
The logo of the 2008 Sukma Games is an image of a 'T' letter, which is the initial of the host state of the Sukma Games, Terengganu. The logo consists of four colors which are black, red, blue and yellow. Black represents Terengganu, the host state of the 2008 Sukma Games, Red represents the fighting spirit of the athletes in achieving victory, Blue represents unity and Terengganu as a coastal state and yellow represents the people involved in the 2008 Sukma Games and Terengganu as a constitutional monarchy state.

Mascot
The official mascot of the 2008 Sukma Games is an Ocellaris Clownfish named Si Diman. It is said that the clownfish is a bisexual fish found in the waters of the islands off the coast of Terengganu. The adoption of the clownfish as the games' mascot is to relate its active and aggressive characters to that of the athletes participated at the games. The smile on the mascot's face represents the joy the games bring to the people. The mascot's name Diman is an abbreviation of the honorific host state of the games, Terengganu, Darul Iman which means Abode of Faith.

Songs
The theme song of the games is "Sukma Dua Belas Terengganu 2008" (The 12th Sukma Games Terengganu 2008).

The games

Participating states

  (460 athletes)
  (484 athletes)
  (285 athletes)
 
  (336 athletes)
  (445 athletes)
  
  (544 athletes)
  (252 athletes)
 
 
 
 
 
  (60 athletes)

Sports

 Aquatic

 
 
 
 
 
 
 
 
 
 
 
 
 
 
 
 
 
 
 
 
 
 
 
 
 
 
 
 
 
   

Demonstration sport

Medal table

Broadcasting
Radio Televisyen Malaysia was responsible for live streaming of several events, opening and closing ceremony of the games.

References

External links
 2008 Sukma Games official website

Sukma
2008 in multi-sport events
Sport in Terengganu
Sukma Games